Wilfred Baddeley defeated Wilberforce Eaves 4–6, 2–6, 8–6, 6–2, 6–3 in the all comers' final to win the gentlemen's singles tennis title at the 1895 Wimbledon Championships. The reigning champion Joshua Pim did not defend his title.

Draw

All comers' finals

Top half

Bottom half

References

External links

Gentlemen's Singles
Wimbledon Championship by year – Men's singles